Dražen "Praja" Dalipagić (born 27 November 1951) is a Serbian former professional basketball player and head coach. He was selected the best athlete of Yugoslavia in the year 1978, and is one of the most decorated athletes in Yugoslavian history. He was named one of FIBA's 50 Greatest Players in 1991. Dalipagić was enshrined into the Naismith Memorial Basketball Hall of Fame as a player in 2004, and into the FIBA Hall of Fame, also as a player, in 2007. In 2008, he was named one of the 50 Greatest EuroLeague Contributors.

During his professional playing career, he scored at least 50 points in a game 15 times. His single-game career scoring high was 70 points scored, achieved during an Italian League game, between Venezia and Virtus Bologna, on 25 January 1987. He was nicknamed "The Sky Jumper".

Professional career
Dalipagić started playing basketball at the age of 19, and one year later he signed his first professional contract with Partizan, in 1971. He stayed in Partizan for eight seasons, until 1980. Over that time, he won the Mr. Europa European Player of the Year award twice, in 1977 and 1978, and the European Player of the Year Euroscar award in 1980. He was declared the best athlete of Yugoslavia in 1978. In the 1975–76 season, he led Partizan to the Yugoslav League title, and also to the European-wide 3rd-tier level FIBA Korać Cup title, in the 1977–78 season. He was also a member of Partizan, at the time when they won the 1978–79 season Korać Cup title, but he was serving in the Yugoslav army at the time.

In the 1980–81 season, he went abroad for the first time in his career. During that season, he played with Reyer Venezia, of the Italian Lega Basket Serie A league. After just one season with Venezia, he returned to his former club, Partizan, for one season. In the following seasons, he played for numerous European teams, including Real Madrid, of the Spanish Primera División, during the 1982–83 season, in which he only played with the club in FIBA European Champions Cup (now called EuroLeague) games. He also played with Reyer Venezia, and Glaxo Verona of the Italian League. He finished his professional career after the 1990–91 season, in which he played with Partizan's arch-rivals, Crvena zvezda.

As a Partizan Belgrade player, he scored 8,278 points, in 305 games played, for a scoring average of 27.1 points per game. While playing in Italy, he scored 7,993 points in 241 games played, for a scoring average of 33.2 points per game. He led the Italian League in scoring average, in the 1987–88 season, with an average of 37.7 points per game.

National team career

Dalipagić debuted for senior the Yugoslavian national basketball team, in 1973. In total, he played in 243 games with Yugoslavia's senior national team, between 1973 and 1986, scoring a total of 3,700 points, which was the most points scored by any player in the history of the Yugoslav national team.

He won the gold medal at the 1978 FIBA World Championship, and the gold medal at the 1980 Summer Olympics. As a member of the Yugoslavian national team, he also won three gold medals at the EuroBasket. His four medals won at the FIBA World Cup (Silver, 1974 FIBA World Championship; Gold, 1978 FIBA World Championship; Bronze, 1982 FIBA World Championship, and 1986 FIBA World Championship) is tied for the all-time international basketball record. A three-time Olympian, Dalipagić was instrumental in the Yugoslavian team's capturing of the gold, at the 1980 Summer Olympics.

Personal life
Dalipagić finished high school at the Technical School in Mostar, and graduated from the Teachers College in Belgrade. He is married to Sonja Požeg, former Yugoslav tennis player. They have two children, Sanja and Davorin.

See also 
 Yugoslav First Federal Basketball League career stats leaders
 List of flag bearers for Yugoslavia at the Olympics

References

External links

 
 Dražen Dalipagić  at Basketball-Reference.com
 
 
 Dražen Dalipagić at the Basketball Hall of Fame
 Dražen Dalipagić at the FIBA Hall of Fame
 Dražen Dalipagić at Interbasket.net
 Dražen Dalipagić FIBA Europe Profile
 Dražen Dalipagić Italian League Profile 
 Euroleague.net 50 Greatest EuroLeague Contributors

1951 births
Living people
Basketball players at the 1976 Summer Olympics
Basketball players at the 1980 Summer Olympics
Basketball players at the 1984 Summer Olympics
Bosnia and Herzegovina expatriate basketball people in Serbia
Competitors at the 1975 Mediterranean Games
European champions for Yugoslavia
Euroscar award winners
FIBA EuroBasket-winning players
FIBA Hall of Fame inductees
FIBA World Championship-winning players
KK Crvena zvezda players
KK Partizan players
KK Lavovi 063 coaches
Lega Basket Serie A players
Medalists at the 1976 Summer Olympics
Medalists at the 1980 Summer Olympics
Medalists at the 1984 Summer Olympics
Mediterranean Games gold medalists for Yugoslavia
Mediterranean Games medalists in basketball
Naismith Memorial Basketball Hall of Fame inductees
Olympic basketball players of Yugoslavia
Olympic bronze medalists for Yugoslavia
Olympic gold medalists for Yugoslavia
Olympic medalists in basketball
Olympic silver medalists for Yugoslavia
Pallalcesto Amatori Udine players
Real Madrid Baloncesto players
Reyer Venezia players
Scaligera Basket Verona players
Serbs of Bosnia and Herzegovina
Small forwards
Basketball players from Mostar
Yugoslav men's basketball players
1974 FIBA World Championship players
1978 FIBA World Championship players
1982 FIBA World Championship players
Yugoslav expatriates in Spain
1986 FIBA World Championship players